David Moreland Truitt (born February 18, 1964) is a former American football tight end in the National Football League for the Washington Redskins.  He played college football at the University of North Carolina.

Truitt is now CEO of Discover Technologies, LLC and former president of Microlink.

References

1964 births
Living people
American football tight ends
North Carolina Tar Heels football players
Washington Redskins players
American chief executives